Annette Dasch (born 24 March 1976) is a German soprano. She performs in operas and concerts.

Biography 
Born in West Berlin, Annette Dasch studied voice at the Hochschule für Musik und Theater München with Josef Loibl.

She made her debut at the Bavarian State Opera as the Gänsemagd (Goose girl) in Humperdinck's Königskinder, at La Scala as Elvira in Mozart's Don Giovanni, at the Salzburg Festival 2006 as Aminta in his Il re pastore, staged and conducted by Thomas Hengelbrock, and at the Paris Opera as Antonia in Offenbach's The Tales of Hoffmann. Her performance of Schumann's Genoveva at the Hessisches Staatstheater Wiesbaden under Marc Piollet was recorded live in 2006. In 2007 she sang Elvira at the Berlin State Opera under Daniel Barenboim. She appeared in Salzburg in 2007 as Haydn's Armida, staged by Christof Loy, and in 2008 as Donna Anna in Don Giovanni. She sang the role of Electra in Mozart's Idomeneo, staged by Dieter Dorn and conducted by Kent Nagano, in the reopening in June 2008 of the Cuvilliés Theatre where the opera had been first performed in 1781. Idomeneo was performed by John Mark Ainsley and Ilia by Juliane Banse. Her debut at the Metropolitan Opera in 2009 was the Countess in Mozart's The Marriage of Figaro, conducted by Fabio Luisi. Her debut at the Bayreuth Festival as Elsa in Wagner's Lohengrin, staged by Hans Neuenfels and conducted by Andris Nelsons, in the opening night 25 July 2010.

On the concert stage she appeared at the Maggio Musicale Fiorentino in Mendelssohn's Elijah with Seiji Ozawa. She sang in Schumann's Das Paradies und die Peri the Vienna Philharmonic conducted by Nikolaus Harnoncourt. With the Gächinger Kantorei and the New York Philharmonic under Helmuth Rilling she appeared in Avery Fisher Hall in Handel's Messiah in 2009.

In December 2014, she returned to the Metropolitan Opera in the role of Eva in Die Meistersinger von Nürnberg.

Dasch is on the jury of the International Song Competition "Das Lied" chaired by Thomas Quasthoff. Composer Richard Beaudoin has dedicated two works to her.

She has a regular show called "Annette's Dasch-Salon" in Berlin, playing with the term "Waschsalon" (laundromat).

Dasch voiced Madame Garderobe in the German dubbing of the 2017 film Beauty and the Beast.

She replaced Anna Netrebko, who withdrew due to exhaustion, as Elsa in Lohengrin at the 2019 Bayreuth Festival.

Personal life
In 2011, Dasch married Austrian baritone Daniel Schmutzhard. They have two children, Fanny and Hans.

Selected recordings 
Carl Orff Carmina Burana – Gert Henning-Jensen, Zeljko Lucic, Orfeón Donostiarra, hr-Sinfonieorchester, conductor Hugh Wolff, Rheingau Musik Festival live in Eberbach Abbey, 2002
Mozart: Il re pastore – Marlis Petersen, Krešimir Špicer, Arpiné Rahdjian, Andreas Karasiak, Balthasar-Neumann-Ensemble, conductor Thomas Hengelbrock, Deutsche Grammophon, DVD 2006
Benjamin Britten War Requiem – James Taylor, Christian Gerhaher, Festivalensemble Stuttgart, conductor Helmuth Rilling, hänssler classic, September 2008
Joseph Haydn Die Schöpfung – Annette Dasch, Christoph Strehl,  Thomas Quasthoff and Vienna Chamber Choir and Austro-Hungarian Haydn Orchestra conducted by Ádám Fischer, Euroarts 2009

References

External links 
  archived on 1 March 2013
 Annette Dasch at IAAC International Artists Management
 Our guest on 04.10.2009 Annette Dasch, Opera Singer Deutsche Welle, 2009 (in German)
 Entries for recordings by Annette Dasch on WorldCat

German operatic sopranos
University of Music and Performing Arts Munich alumni
Living people
1976 births
Winners of the Geneva International Music Competition
21st-century German women opera singers